Rose Repetto (1907 – 1984) was an Italian-born French business owner. She established the Repetto ballet shoe company.

She was born in Milan. Repetto designed a ballet shoe for her son, the dancer Roland Petit, at her workshop in Paris in 1947. She developed ballet flats for Brigitte Bardot in 1956 for the film And God Created Woman. They were known as Cendrillon, from the French version of Cinderella, and became popular as a fashion shoe. In 1959, she opened a boutique 22 rue de la Paix in Paris. Her customers included Maurice Béjart, Rudolf Nureyev, Mikhail Baryshnikov, Carolyn Carlson, the Kirov Ballet and the Folies Bergère.

She died in Paris. After Rose Repetto died, her son sold the company.

References 

1907 births
1984 deaths
French fashion designers
20th-century French businesswomen
20th-century French businesspeople
Fashion designers from Milan
French women fashion designers
Italian fashion designers
Italian women fashion designers
Shoe designers
Shoemakers
Italian emigrants to France